The Gymnasium Theodorianum is a grammar school situated in the historic centre of Paderborn, Germany. Succeeding in the tradition of the cathedral school founded in 799, it is among the ten oldest schools in the world. It continues in the ideals of Renaissance humanism, with Latin taught as the primary foreign language and Ancient Greek offered as an additional subject. The school has produced several leading German political, scientific, religious and military figures. It is known locally simply as the “Theo”.

History

Medieval Cathedral School 
The exact founding year cannot be established definitively. It is however directly linked to the construction of the Paderborn Cathedral in 777, along with a monastery in 780. On the occasion of Pope Leo III’s visit to Paderborn in 799, Charlemagne made a donation to the monastery, which likely included the cathedral school. This date is therefore widely considered the original founding date. The location of the school changed a number of times over subsequent years, within the immediate vicinity of the cathedral. Altmann, Bishop of Passau (1015-1091) is the first documented headmaster of the school. Further early headmasters included Reinher of Paderborn (1140-1190), who found a better method for calculating the Easter date, and crusader Cardinal Thomas Olivier (1170-1227).

Gymnasium Salentinianum and Growth under the Prince-Bishops 

Following a period of decline during the 14th century, in competition with the appearance of universities, the school experienced a renewal under the rule of Bishop Salentin of Isenburg and headmaster Hermann von Kerssenbroch in the 1500s. The influence of renaissance humanism from this period is still a distinctive presence in the school ethos and curriculum. The school became Lutheran soon thereafter, like most of the citizenry of Paderborn, until the efforts of the Jesuits gradually led to a return of the school to Catholicism, marking the beginning of the Counter Reformation in the region. Under the Prince-bishop of Paderborn, Theodor von Fürstenberg, the forceful submission of Lutheranism in Paderborn was complete by 1604.

During this time the school also gradually moved to its current location, away from the immediate vicinity of the cathedral, with the current school buildings completed in 1612 and the church completed in 1692. The church, with a significant baroque altar, is used for school services to this day. The name Theodorianum also stems from this time.

Following the devastation of the Thirty Years War the school and wider region experienced a period of baroque bloom, at times numbered among the largest schools in Westphalia with up to 1000 pupils. A notable alumnus from this time is the important baroque architect and general Johann Conrad Schlaun, responsible for such buildings as Schloss Münster and the Erbdrostenhof.

New Humanism under Prussian Rule 
 The annexation of the region by Prussia in 1802 resulted in the development of the school along the lines of German new humanism. Protestant and Jewish pupils were now admitted and the curriculum modernised according to the Humboldtian model of higher education under Friedrich Kohlrausch. In 1874 the school was officially secularised, ending its overt association with the Catholic Church, with its last clerical headmaster leaving in 1884. A rapid growth in student numbers at this time necessitated the expansion of the school buildings, completed in 1893.

From 1847 to 1979 a minor seminary was established by the Archdiocese in the nearby Liborianum for boys considering the priesthood. The majority of their education was provided by the Theodorianum.

Notable pupils from this period were the German Chancellor Wilhelm Cuno, the “father of modern analysis” Karl Weierstrass, the anatomist Heinrich Wilhelm Waldeyer, the composer Engelbert Humperdinck, and the resistance fighter Paul Lejeune-Jung.

The school today
 Between January and March 1945 the school was severely damaged by bombing, including the complete destruction of its library of 14 000 books. Reconstruction of the school was largely completed by 1954, with the main spire finished in 1975 and the church's baroque altar in 2004. From 1971 the school began to accept girls, though a boys’ class remained into the 1990s.

From 2013 to 2014 the school worked in partnership with the Mildenhall College Academy, Suffolk to create a monument commemorating the Christmas Truce. The monument is thought to be the first of its kind in Europe. It is located in the Peace Village of Mesen, Belgium.

Languages 
Latin remains compulsory in Years 5-10 (approximately ages 10–16), being optional thereafter. English is also compulsory as a foreign language, though secondary to Latin. In Year 8 (age 14), either French or Ancient Greek are chosen as additional languages. From Year 10 (age 16), Spanish is also optionally available.

Notable alumni 

 Altmann von Passau († 1105), Bishop of Passau
 Saint Vicelinus (1090–1154), Bishop of Oldenburg in Holstein
 Athanasius Kircher (1602-1680), Jesuit polymath, "Master of a Hundred Arts"
 Vitus Georg Tönnemann (1659-1740), confessor to Emperor Charles VI
 Johann Conrad Schlaun (1695–1773), Baroque architect and soldier
 Karl Becker (philologist) (1775–1849), physician, educationalist, and philologist
 Friedrich Wilhelm Weber (1813–1894), poet and member of Prussian Assembly 
 Karl Weierstrass (1815–1897), Mathematician, “father of modern analysis”
 Wilhelm Wilmers (1817–1899), Jesuit
 Franz von Löher (1818–1892), historian, jurist, and activist in the German revolutions of 1848–1849
 August Potthast (1824–1898), historian and librarian of the Reichstag
 Heinrich Wilhelm Waldeyer (1836–1921), anatomist, known for summarizing neuron theory and for naming the chromosome
 Clemens Bäumker (1853–1924), historian of philosophy
 Engelbert Humperdinck (1854–1921), composer, best known for the opera Hansel and Gretel
 Caspar Klein (1865–1941), Archbishop of Paderborn and opponent of Nazism
 Wilhelm Cuno (1876–1933), Chancellor of Germany
 Paul Lejeune-Jung (1882–1944), member of the Reichstag, and resistance fighter against Adolf Hitler's Third Reich
 Hugo Aufderbeck (1909-1981), theologian, Bishop and Apostolic Administrator in Erfurt-Meiningen.
 Franz Hengsbach (1910–1991), Cardinal of the Roman Catholic Church and Bishop of Essen
 Franz-Joseph Schulze (1918–2005), General, NATO Commander in Chief, Allied Forces Central Europe (CINCENT). Recipient of the Knight's Cross of the Iron Cross during World War II
 Friedrich Wilhelm Christians (1922–2004), chairman of the supervisory board of Deutsche Bank and president of the Association of German Banks
 Werner Franke (1940–2022), molecular biologist
 Elmar Brok (* 1946), Member of the European Parliament (MEP) from 1980 until 2019, best known for his role as chairman of the European Parliament Committee on Foreign Affairs
 Franz-Josef Bode (* 1951), Bishop of Osnabrück, Deputy Chairman of the German Bishops' Conference
 Gerhard Jorch (* 1951), pediatrician
 Burkhard Blienert (* 1966), Member of the Bundestag
 Claudia Buch (* 1966), economist, Vice President of the Bundesbank
 Bernd Hüttemann (* 1970), Vice President of the European Movement International

Literature 
 Conrad Bade: Das Theodorianische Gymnasium von 1609–1773 und die spätern Verhältnisse desselben bis zu seiner Reorganisation durch die Preußische Regierung 1819. In: Zeitschrift für vaterländische Geschichte und Altertumskunde, Vol 10 (1847), p. 60–114 (Google Books, Sonderdruck: ULB Münster)
 Festschrift zur Feier des dreihundertjährigen Jubiläums des königlichen Gymnasiums Theodorianum in Paderborn 1912. Verlag: Junfermannsche Buchdruckerei.
 Das Paderborner Gymnasium Theodorianum und seine Baugeschichte; Segin, Leppelmann, Mensing, 1954.
 Festschrift des Gymnasiums Theodorianum in Paderborn zur 350. Wiederkehr der Grundsteinlegung des Schulgebäudes 1962. Eds.: F.-J. Weber, F. Ostermann, E. Nitsche. Verlag: Westfalen Druckerei GmbH.
 Von der Domschule zum Theodorianum Paderborn, Klemens Honselmann, Verein für Altertumskunde Westfalens Abteilung Paderborn, Band 3, Bonifacius Druckerei Paderborn, 1962.
 
 Butterwegge, Hubert: Viri illustres aus Paderborn: eine Tafel als Visitenkarte des altehrwürdigen Gymnasium Theodorianum. In: Jahrbuch Westfalen 48.1994 (1993) S. 35–38: Ill.

See also
 List of Jesuit educational institutions

External links 

 Official Website
 TheoGo!

References 

17th-century architecture
799 establishments
Gymnasiums in Germany
Jesuit schools in Germany
Educational institutions established in the 8th century
Schools in North Rhine-Westphalia
Jesuit history in Germany
Buildings and structures completed in 799